Wyne may refer to:

People

Surname
 Ehsan Wyne (born 1938), Pakistani lawyer and political figure
 Ghulam Haider Wyne (1940–1993), Pakistani politician and Chief Minister of Punjab
 Wyne Lay (born 1994), Burmese singer-songwriter and model
 Begum Majeeda Wyne, Pakistani politician, wife of Ghulam Haider Wyne
 Zaneta Wyne (born 1990), American soccer player

Other
 Wyne Su Khine Thein (born 1986), Burmese singer and actress
 Wyne (film director), Burmese filmmaker Tun Zaw Win (born 1973)

Radio stations
 WYNE-LP, a low-power radio station (95.9 FM) licensed to serve Wayne, New Jersey, United States
 WZTE, a radio station (1530 AM) licensed to serve North East, Pennsylvania, United States, which held the call sign WYNE from 2004 to 2013
 WHBY, a radio station (1150 AM) licensed to serve Kimberly, Wisconsin, United States, which held the call sign WYNE until 1992

Other uses
 Wyna (river), a river in Switzerland also known as the Wyne
 Wyne (tribe), a Jat Muslim tribe of Pakistan

See also
 Wyn, a surname
 Wynne (disambiguation)
 Wine (disambiguation)